Davide De Luca, better known as Gemitaiz (born 4 November 1988), is an Italian rapper. Besides his solo work, he has collaborated with many artists, most notably the Italian rapper MadMan. He was born in Rome. From 2007 to 2011 he was a member of the "Xtreme Team", a collective of rappers from Rome. His debut solo album came out in May 2013, with the title “L'unico compromesso” (“The Only Compromise”). It ended up peaking at the #3 spot on the Italian charts.

Discography

Albums

EPs

Compilation albums

Collaborative mixtapes (with Xtreme Team)
2006: Affare romano vol. 1 (with Xtreme Team)
2007: Affare romano vol. 2 (with Xtreme Team)
2008: No(mix)tape (with Xtreme Team)
2009: Affare romano zero (with Xtreme Team)
2010: Xtreme Time (with Xtreme Team)
2011: Xtreme Quality (with Xtreme Team)

Singles

Featured in

Other songs

External links

References

Italian rappers
1988 births
Living people
Musicians from Rome
Universal Music Group artists